Happiness is the eleventh studio album by Japanese J-pop singer and songwriter Maki Ohguro. It was released on 22 June 2005 under EMI Japan.

This album consist of two previously released singles, such as Asahi~Shine&Groove~ and Over Top.

The album reached No. 28 in its first week on the Oricon chart. The album sold 21,000 copies.

Track listing

In media
Asahi~Shine&Groove~: official support song for Japan Hockey Association Official Japanese National Team: Women's Hockey Team
Over Top: official theme song for Bridgestone's INDY JAPAN 300mile

References

Universal Music Japan albums
Japanese-language albums
2005 albums
Maki Ohguro albums